Erandol Assembly constituency  is one of the 288 Vidhan Sabha constituencies of Maharashtra state in western India. This constituency is located in the Jalgaon district.

It is part of the Jalgaon Lok Sabha constituency along with another five Vidhan Sabha segments of this district, namely Jalgaon City, Jalgaon Rural, Amalner, Chalisgaon and Pachora.

Members of Legislative Assembly
 1951: Birla Sitaram Hirachand, Indian National Congress
 1957: Birla Sitaram Hirachand, Indian National Congress
 1962: Digambar Shankar Patil, Indian National Congress
 1967: Digambar Shankar Patil, Indian National Congress
 1972: Digambar Shankar Patil, Indian National Congress
 1978: Patil Mahendrasinh Dharmsin, Janata Party
 1980: Wagh Parubai Chandrabhan, Indian National Congress (I)
 1985: Wagh Parubai Chandrabhan, Indian National Congress
 1990: Hari Atmaram Mahajan, Shiv Sena
 1995: Patil Mahendrasinh Dharamsinh, Janata Dal
 1999: Gulab Raghunath Patil, Shiv Sena
 2004: Gulab Raghunath Patil, Shiv Sena
 2009: Chimanrao Patil, Shiv Sena
 2014: Annasaheb Dr. Satish Bhaskarrao Patil, Nationalist Congress Party
 2019: Chimanrao Patil, Shiv Sena

See also
 Erandol
 List of constituencies of Maharashtra Vidhan Sabha

References

Assembly constituencies of Maharashtra
Jalgaon district